George Clark (March 22, 1890 Tulsa, Oklahoma – October 17, 1978 Fort Worth, Texas) was an American racecar driver.

Indy 500 results

References

1890 births
1978 deaths
Indianapolis 500 drivers
Sportspeople from Tulsa, Oklahoma
Racing drivers from Oklahoma
World Sportscar Championship drivers

Carrera Panamericana drivers